The common Chinese tree frog (Hyla chinensis), also known under common names common Chinese treetoad and Chinese tree toad (Chinese Traditional: 中國雨蛙  Chinese Simplified: 中国雨蛙 Pinyin: Zhōngguó yǔwā), is a species of frog in the family Hylidae found in southeastern and eastern China and in Taiwan. There is also one record from Vietnam but it is uncertain whether it really represents this species or Hyla annectans.

H. chinensis is a small frog,  in snout–vent length, inhabiting trees and shrubs in forests, but also living in agricultural landscapes (cultivated rice fields, ponds, and corn bushes).

The International Union for Conservation of Nature (IUCN) has classified H. chinensis as of "least concern", but it can suffer from habitat loss.

References

Hyla
Amphibians of China
Amphibians of Taiwan
Amphibians described in 1859
Taxa named by Albert Günther
Taxonomy articles created by Polbot